James Edwin Darnell Jr. (born September 9, 1930, Columbus, Mississippi) is an American biologist who made significant contributions to RNA processing and cytokine signaling and is author of the cell biology textbook Molecular Cell Biology.

In 2004, he was elected a foreign member of the Royal Swedish Academy of Sciences. He became a member of the American Philosophical Society in 2013.

Since 2013, Darnell has been listed on the Advisory Council of the National Center for Science Education.

He is married to Norwegian former model and dress shop owner Kristin Holby, known as "Clotilde", whose daughter Phoebe, a financial analyst, is married to businessman Divya Narendra.

Awards 

 1999 Dickson Prize
 1999 Cancer Research Institute William B. Coley Award
 2002 National Medal of Science
 2002 Albert Lasker Special Achievement Award
 2010 Hope Funds Award in Basic Research
 2012 Albany Medical Center Prize

References

External links
Laboratory of Molecular Cell Biology (James Darnell's Lab at The Rockefeller University)

Living people
21st-century American biologists
American textbook writers
American male non-fiction writers
National Medal of Science laureates
Foreign Members of the Royal Society
Members of the Royal Swedish Academy of Sciences
Place of birth missing (living people)
1930 births
Rockefeller University people
Fellows of the AACR Academy